Chaahat may refer to:

 Chaahat (1996 film), a 1996 Bollywood film by director Mahesh Bhatt
 Chaahat (1971 film), a 1971 Bollywood romance film directed by Homi Bhattacharya
 Chahat Pandey, Indian television actress
Chahatt Khanna, Indian film actress